No. 151 Squadron was a squadron of the Royal Air Force.

History

World War I
No. 151 squadron was founded at Hainault Farm in Essex on 12 June 1918, and was equipped with Sopwith Camel aircraft.
During the five months in which 151 Squadron had taken part in hostilities overseas, the total number of hours flown by night was 1443 hrs 26 mins.

Sixteen enemy aircraft were destroyed at night on the Allies side of the lines, and five were destroyed on the enemy side and confirmed. Another five were unconfirmed, thus making a total of twenty six successful engagements. Of the enemy aircraft destroyed, twenty two were AEGs, Friedrichshafen or Gothas, with two engines and carrying a crew of three or more. Two were giant P 52's with five engines carrying a crew of up to eight or nine.

During all the numerous combats there were very few occasions when the guns jammed or caused trouble, reflecting the devotion to duty of Lt Eggar and his gunnery staff.

The squadron was disbanded on 10 September 1919.

World War II
On 4 August 1936 the squadron was reformed at RAF North Weald from 'B' Flight of 56 Squadron, as a fighter squadron, flying Gloster Gauntlets. In December 1938 these were exchanged for Hawker Hurricanes, when the squadron came under Squadron Leader Edward Mortlock Donaldson. It operated throughout the Second World War, flying with Hawker Hurricanes, Boulton Paul Defiants and later de Havilland Mosquitoes, disbanding on 10 October 1946 at RAF Weston Zoyland.

After World War II

The squadron was reformed again at RAF Leuchars, Scotland on 15 September 1951 as a night fighter unit, initially operating De Havilland Vampire NF.10s and later Gloster Meteor NF.11s. It disbanded on 19 September 1961.

On 1 January 1962 the Signals Development Squadron at RAF Watton was redesignated as No. 151 Squadron operating a variety of aircraft on development and training duties. It was joined by the pilots and ground crew from the disbanded No. 97 (Strategic Missile) Squadron from RAF Hemswell on 25 May 1963.

On 18 September 1981 151 Squadron reformed at RAF Chivenor as part of No. 2 Tactical Weapons Unit RAF (2 TWU) operating BAE Hawk T1 & T1A aircraft. When 2 TWU became No. 7 Flying Training School RAF in 1992, 151 Squadron was disbanded and its duties taken over by 92 Squadron.

Aircraft operated

Squadron bases

Commanding officers

References

Notes

Bibliography

 .

External links

 Squadron history on RAF website
 Diary History of 151 Fighter Squadron RAF
 Squadron histories 151-155 sqn.

151 Squadron
Military units and formations established in 1918
Military units and formations of the Royal Air Force in World War I
Aircraft squadrons of the Royal Air Force in World War II
RAF squadrons involved in the Battle of Britain
1918 establishments in the United Kingdom
Military units and formations disestablished in 1992